The Lottery of Happiness (French: La loterie du bonheur) is a 1953 French comedy film directed by Jean Gehret and starring Yves Deniaud, Suzanne Dehelly and Annette Poivre.

Cast

References

Bibliography
 Alfred Krautz. International directory of cinematographers, set- and costume designers in film, Volume 4. Saur, 1984.

External links 
 

1953 films
French comedy films
1950s French-language films
French black-and-white films
1953 comedy films
Films directed by Jean Gehret
1950s French films